The 152 mm gun-howitzer M1955, also known as the D-20, is a manually loaded, towed 152 mm gun-howitzer artillery piece, manufactured in the Soviet Union during the 1950s. It was first observed by the west in 1955, at which time it was designated the M1955. Its GRAU index is 52-P-546.

History
152 mm has been a Russian calibre since World War I, when Britain supplied 6 inch Howitzers and Russia purchased 152 mm guns from Schneider (probably derived from the 155 mm Gun Mle 1877/16) for the Imperial Army. The new gun-howitzer, was a replacement of the pre-war ML-20 gun-howitzer (the 152 mm howitzer M1937) and various World War II era 152 mm field howitzers, Model 09/30, Model 1910/30, Model 1938 M10 and Model 1943 D-1. By Soviet definition, a 152 mm howitzer is 'medium'-calibre artillery. It was designated a 'gun-howitzer' because its muzzle velocity exceeded 600 m/s, and its barrel length exceeded 30 calibres. It equipped battalions in the motor rifle division artillery regiment and army level artillery brigades.

The design, which was probably initiated in the late 1940s, was first seen in public in 1955. It was designed by the well established design bureau at Artillery Plant No 9 in Sverdlovsk (now Motovilikha Plants in Yekaterinburg) led by the eminent artillery designer Fyodor Fyodorovich Petrov (1902–1978), who was responsible for several World War II pieces. The gun's factory designation was "D-20".

The carriage is the same one used for the D-74 122 mm field gun. The barrel assembly is the basis for the D-22 (GRAU index: 2A33), which is used for the self-propelled 2S3 Akatsiya ("Acacia").

Description

The D-20 has a 26 calibre (3.962 m) barrel, with a double baffle muzzle brake and a semi-automatic vertical sliding-block breech, with a tied jaw and the block moving down to open. The barrel is mounted in a long ring cradle with the trunnions just forward of the breech. The recoil system (buffer and recuperator) is mounted on the cradle above the barrel. Compression balancing gear is attached behind the saddle support, passing through the complex shaped saddle to connect to the cradle just forward of the trunnions. This can be manually re-pressured by a pump below the breech. The breech has a projectile retaining catch to prevent the shell sliding out at higher elevations before it is rammed with a manual rammer.

Top traverse totals 58° and the vertical elevation range is −5° to 45°.

Box girder section split trail legs are hinged to the cradle support, with bolts to lock them into either the open or closed position. The cradle support also has a bolt for locking the barrel in the centre for traverse before towing the gun. Large spades are permanently fixed close to the end of each trail; these are hinged and it appears that the gun can be fired with them up or down depending on the terrain, but they are always up when the gun is towed.

To assist with all-round carriage traverse, there is a pivot jack mounted at the front of the cradle support. The pivot jack is not a sole plate and the gun fires with its foam filled rubber tyred wheels supporting the gun on the ground. When the gun is brought into action, the pivot jack is folded down and adjusted to be on the ground. If a large traverse is required, small jacks on each trail leg are rotated downwards, and the trails jacked up until the main wheels are lifted clear of the ground and the bogey wheels mounted on each trail leg swung downwards and the trail jacks raised, the carriage is then traversed, and the trail jacks re-used to lift the bogey wheels and then place the piece back on its main wheels.

The pivot jack is also used to secure the barrel against vertical movement when the gun is being towed. The barrel is locked in the centre for traverse with a bolt on the cradle support. The jack is folded upwards, lugs on the ring cradle engage the jack base and two tensioners fixed to the saddle support are hooked to the cradle, these are tightened to lock the cradle onto the jack base.

As was normal for the period, the gun has a shield, including a folding piece below the cradle support. The centre section of the upper shield slides both up and down and folds to accommodate the barrel at higher elevation angles of fire. The shield may offer some protection against muzzle blast to the sights and layer, although it is usually shown being fired with a long lanyard, but is probably mostly for defence against machine gun fire.

The non-reciprocating sights are standard Soviet pattern, designed for one-man laying. Included are a direct fire anti-tank telescope (OP4M), a panoramic periscopic indirect-fire sight, a dial sight, (PG1M) in a mounting, an angle of sight scale, and a range drum for each charge engraved with the range (distance) scale, coupled to an elevation leveling bubble mounted on dial sight mount. The range drum enables the standard Soviet technique of semi-direct fire when the piece is laid visually on the target and the range set on the range drum.

Like most Soviet artillery, the gun fires separate ammunition using metal cartridge cases that also provide obturation. The ammunition is interchangeable with that used with other 152 mm guns, although the more modern ones also have a third, much larger cartridge. The D-20 uses two types of cartridge; one has a base charge and up to five increments, the other is a single 'super' charge cartridge. The standard shell weight is 44 kg with a muzzle velocity of 655 m/s, but some projectiles are more or less than this. The basic shell is high explosive (HE) and Fragmentation (HE-Frag). Other projectiles include smoke, illuminating, chemical and probably incendiary. Later projectiles include bomblet, anti-personnel land mine, flechette, Krasnopol precision-guided munition (PGM), communication jammer, and extended range HE using rocket assistance (RAP). The normal maximum range is 17.4 km, RAP being farther. Two direct-fire anti-tank projectiles have been used, high-explosive anti-tank (HEAT) and armour-piercing ammunition (APHE), the latter being 5.2 kg heavier and with a lower muzzle velocity.

The maximum rate of fire is usually stated as five rounds/minute, and 65 rounds/hour sustained. In Soviet service, the unit of fire was 60 rounds.

The detachment was either 8 or 10 men, probably differing between armies and the time period. In Soviet service, the 5,700 kg gun was usually towed by a URAL-375 6×6 truck or, in some regions, an AT-S or AT-L medium tractor.

Operational history 

During the 2022 Invasion of Ukraine both sides have relied on the D-20.  Russian forces have started deploying the weapons from storage. There are reports of at least one Russian D-20 being destroyed due to poor ammunition. This weapon was in the service of the Luhansk People’s Republic.

Variants

Russian Federation
The Khitin is an improved version with an automatic rammer for an increased firing rate of 7-8 rds/min.

People's Republic of China
 Type 66 – Licensed version of D-20; improved version known as Type 66-1
 Type 83 – Towed self-propelled version of Type 66, very similar layout to the 2S3

Democratic People’s Republic of Korea
The US Defense Intelligence Agency has reported the existence of several self-propelled artillery systems, mating existing cannon systems with a locally designed chassis. The SPH 152mm M1974 appears to be a D-20 or Type 66 mounted on a tracked chassis Tokchon.

Similar weapons

Romania
 A411 – System designed by Arsenalul Armatei; very similar to D-20, but has different 152 mm ordnance, 25 calibres long, range of 17.2 km (24 km with OF-550 projectile); in Romanian Army; known as 152 mm towed gun-howitzer M1981
 A412 – License-built Chinese Type 59-1 with a D-20 carriage; in Romanian Army, is known as 130 mm towed gun M1982
 A425 – Variant using D-20 carriage; designed in Romania using Chinese technology, 152 mm ordnance, 34 calibres long, performs similar to 152 mm howitzer 2A65 "Msta-B"; maximum range is 22–24 km; in Romanian Army, is known as 152 mm towed gun-howitzer M1985; offered for export as Model 1984

Former Yugoslavia
 Gun-howitzer M84 NORA or NORA On the basis of construction documents for the D-20 and experience with producing the M114 155 mm howitzer, this new type of weapon with greater range was developed by Military Technical Institute Belgrade. While it retains some elements of the original carriage, almost everything else is redesigned and modernized starting with the barrel, which is replaced by the new L/39.7 barrel.

Ammunition

 HE-Frag, OF-32 – range 18,400 meters
 DPICM
 DPICM-BB
 Incendiary
 Expendable jammer
 Chemical
 Flechette
 Semi-active laser-guided "Krasnopol"

Wars

Operators

Current

Former

Gallery

See also 
 2A36 Giatsint-B
 152 mm howitzer 2A65 Msta-B

References

External links

 Type 66 152 mm towed gun-howitzer

152 mm artillery
Field artillery of the Cold War
Howitzers of the Soviet Union
Motovilikha Plants products
Military equipment introduced in the 1950s
Cold War artillery of the Soviet Union